The Terrace Ballroom was a ballroom, located on 464 South Main Street, in Salt Lake City, Utah. During the 1930s, when it was called "Coconut Grove", there was no larger ballroom in the United States. Its name was changed in the 1940s to "Rainbow Randevu",. The operators of Lagoon Amusement Park began leasing the venue in 1958 and changed the name to Danceland. The name was changed again to The Terrace Ballroom a year later. A policy was in place excluding blacks, but Robert E. Freed opened the ballroom to all people as he did with Lagoon.

The ballroom has hosted concerts by many famous artists, including Kansas, Frank Zappa, Grateful Dead, Wishbone Ash, The Moody Blues, Pink Floyd, Led Zeppelin, KISS, The Police, Alice Cooper, Janis Joplin, Jefferson Airplane & The Doors, among others. In addition, weekly dances were held with a live orchestra every Tuesday night until it closed.

Lagoon Corporation's lease of The Terrace was up in 1978 and the owner, Little America Company had plans to replace it with a new high-rise or a parking lot. A concert was held on December 11, 1978 and featured Claudia Appling singing folk, Cow Jazz known for country-rock, and Anthem, an upcoming rock-metal band. Promoted by Raymond Cannefax as a token of respect to a venue he felt was one of America's best concert halls, in line with San Francisco's Winterland. Claudia Appling sang Joni Mitchell's Big Yellow Taxi with its apropos chorus, "They paved Paradise and put up a parking lot." Claudia Appling, a performing and recording artists, became known in the mid-1970's as Montana Rose and resides in Montana. Raymond Cannefax left the music promotion business and became a successful entrepreneur in the telecommunications industry and founded Salt Lake City's Apollo Telecom which was absorbed by Japanese business magnate, Hideo Gotto and NTT, Japan's AT&T. Soon after, Little America reconsidered their plans and extended the lease for three more years and hosted bands such as Journey, Steppenwolf, Hank Williams, Jr., The Police and Frank Zappa.

The last concert held at the Terrace Ballroom was The David LaFlamme Band, who played there on December 26, 1981. LaFlamme (born Gary Posie) was a former member of the San Francisco band It's a Beautiful Day, known for its signature song "White Bird". One more dance was held on New Year's Eve 1981 and The Terrace closed for good. After a fire in 1987, the building was demolished. The site is now occupied by a parking lot.

References

External links
 A History of the Terrace

Demolished music venues in the United States
Buildings and structures in Salt Lake City
Music venues in Utah